W. W. Watson may refer to:
William W. Watson Sr., 19th century North Carolina politician
William Weldon Watson (1899–1992), American nuclear physicist